ManoramaMAX is an Indian subscription video on-demand and over-the-top streaming service, owned and operated by MM TV Ltd. It was launched on 1 September 2019 by Mammen Mathew, Chief Editor and Managing Director of Malayala Manorama Group at Kottayam, Kerala.

The app combines the offerings of Mazhavil Manorama and Manorama News. It is an on-demand video streaming platform providing entertainment and news exclusively in Malayalam language. ManoramaMAX is currently available on Web, Android, iOS,LG Smart TV (WebOS), Samsung TV (Tizen) and Google Chromecast.

Content 

ManoramaMAX's content includes news, shows and movies.

References

Broadcasting in India
Video on demand services